Jan Melville Swain McShane (11 December 1910 – ) was a rugby union player who represented Australia.

McShane, a  scrum-half, was born in Tamworth, New South Wales and claimed a total of 2 international rugby caps for Australia.

References

Australian rugby union players
Australia international rugby union players
1910 births
1975 deaths
Rugby union players from New South Wales
Rugby union scrum-halves